Weichai Power Co., Ltd is a developer and manufacturer of diesel engines with headquarters in Weifang, Shandong in the People's Republic of China. It also manufactures forklifts and non-diesel engine automotive parts.

History

Weichai Power was founded on 23 December 2002. Its shares began trading on the Hong Kong Stock Exchange in 2004 and the Shenzhen Stock Exchange in 2007.

In 2009, Weichai bought French marine engine manufacturer Moteurs Baudouin.

Weichai became the first Scuderia Ferrari sponsor from China in January 2013; the sponsorship was to end in 2016.

The company appeared on the Fortune 500 list for the first time in 2021 as rank 425.

Awards
 2007 China Quality Award

References

Weichai Group
Companies listed on the Hong Kong Stock Exchange
Companies listed on the Shenzhen Stock Exchange
Energy companies established in 2002
Chinese brands
Government-owned companies of China
Companies based in Shandong
2002 establishments in China
Chinese companies established in 2002
Forklift truck manufacturers
Diesel engine manufacturers
Electrical generation engine manufacturers
Automotive transmission makers
Engine manufacturers of China